Panagiotis Karnezis (born 1967 in Amaliada), known as Panos Karnezis, is a Greek writer. Born in Greece, he moved to England in 1992 to study Engineering. He was later awarded a M.A. in Creative Writing by the University of East Anglia.

His first collection of stories, Little Infamies, was published in 2002. In 2004 he published The Maze (to some critical acclaim), a novel set during the Greco-Turkish War of 1919-1922.  His latest novel is The Convent, published by W.W. Norton in 2010, and he is also the author of The Birthday Party (2007).

Karnezis originally comes from the western part of Greece Elis (regional unit) part of the Peloponnese peninsula. He lives in London.

Bibliography 

Little Infamies (London, 2002)
The Maze (London, 2004)
The Birthday Party (2007)
The Convent (2010)
The Fugitives (2015)
We Are Made of Earth (2019)

References

1967 births
Living people
Alumni of the University of East Anglia
Greek emigrants to England
British writers

People from Amaliada